David Reynolds may refer to:
 David Reynolds (author) (born 1948), English publisher and author 
 David Reynolds (historian) (born 1952), English professor of history
 David Reynolds (racing driver) (born 1985), Australian racing car driver
 David Reynolds (screenwriter), American screenwriter for television and film
 David H. Reynolds, co-owner of a mobile home parks business in the United States
 David K. Reynolds (active since 1976), American psychologist
 David P. Reynolds (1915–2011), American businessman, also owner and breeder of thoroughbred racing horses
 David S. Reynolds (born 1948), American historian
 Dave Reynolds (musician) (born 1972), South African composer and multi-instrumentalist

See also
 David Reynolds (Jericho), character in 2006 TV series Jericho